British Indians are Indians residing in Britain and British people of Indian descent.

British Indian or British Indians may also refer to:
 Nationals of British India, more commonly known by the demonym Indian people
 Of or relating to British India or the period of British rule in India
 The British Indian Army
 The British Indian Association, a political association in 19th and early 20th-century India
 The British Indian Ocean Territory, or people or other matters related thereto
 Anglo-Indians, people of mixed British and Indian descent